Xerosecta adolfi is species of small air-breathing land snail, a terrestrial pulmonate gastropod mollusk in the family Geomitridae, the hairy snails and their allies. 

This species is endemic to Spain.

References

 Pfeiffer, L. (1854). Nachschrift zu S. 251. Malakozoologische Blätter. Cassel (Theodor Fischer). 1 (8): 264
 Bank, R. A.; Neubert, E. (2017). Checklist of the land and freshwater Gastropoda of Europe. Last update: July 16th, 2017.

External links
 

Geomitridae
Endemic fauna of Spain
Gastropods described in 1854
Taxonomy articles created by Polbot